The Agency for Defense Policy and Technology Development (BPKTP) is an agency subordinate to the Indonesian Ministry of Defense. The agency tasked to perform research and development in defense and military affairs.

The agency can be considered as military counterpart of the National Research and Innovation Agency (BRIN).

History

1967-1983 
On 24 August 1967, Suharto signed Presidential Decision No. 132/1967 (On Changes in Organization Fundamentals and Procedures in Field of Defense and Security). The decision reorganized the Republic of Indonesia Armed Forces. It was decided to form a military research institute within the Armed Forces, Defense and Security Research and Development Institute (Lalitbanghankam). Lalitbanghankam was placed under the Armed Forces HQ. However, due to communication and command issues at that time due to Armed Forces and Department of Defense and Security were not integrated, Suharto later signed Presidential Decision No. 79/1969 on 4 October 1969, which amend the previous decision. The new decision combined the Department of Defense and Security with Armed Forces by stating that Armed Forces is organic part of Department of Defense and Security and core of National Defense and Security System formulated by Suharto. As result, Lalitbanghankam effectively integrated to Department of Defense and Security and become Research and Development Center (Puslitbang) under the Department of Defense and Security. On 18 February 1974, the Puslitbang become Research and Development Center for Defense and Security (Puslitbang Hankam).

By passage of the Law No. 20/1982 (On State Defense and Security Fundamentals), the law reformed Department of Defense and Security/Republic of Indonesia Armed Forces by liquidating and reorganizing organization of the institution. Puslitbang Hankam was reorganized by the law. On 5 October 1983, Puslitbang Hankam fused with elements from Bureau of Data Collection and Processing (Biro Pullahta) of Department of Defense and Security General Secretariat into a new agency, Agency for Industrial and Technology Research and Development of Department of Defense and Security (BPPIT Dephankam). BPPIT Dephankam was placed under Department of Defense and Security.

1983-2009 
BPPIT Dephankam was operated for next 16 years. On 26 October 1999, Abdurrachman Wahid, issued Presidential Decision No. 355/M/1999 on inauguration of his cabinet. His cabinet separated Armed Forces and Department of Defense. The "Security" part was separated from the then Department of Defense name, likely to erase the uneasiness from memory of Suharto's New Order regime. Thus, BPPIT Dephankam become Agency for Industrial and Technology Research and Development of Department of Defense (BPPIT Dephan). BPPIT Dephan later renamed to Agency Research and Development of Department of Defense (Balitbang Dephan).

With issuance of Presidential Decree No. 47/2009 by Susilo Bambang Yudhoyono on standardization of ministry names, "Department" word ditched and replaced with "Ministry". While the ministry now named Ministry of Defense, the agency now named Defense Research and Development Agency (Balitbang Kemhan or Balitbanghan).

2009-2022 
Balitbanghan was operated until 2022, until finally the agency was also targeted to be liquidated by Indonesian government in favor of National Research and Innovation Agency (BRIN). In January 2022, BRIN decided only focused in research on civilian affairs for flexibility and easiness to get partner in research collaborations. Research in military affairs and defense and security affairs decided to be left out due to critical position and national security interests and reasons. As the result, only Balitbanghan that left out from the integration of ministerial research and development agencies into BRIN, although part of the researchers transferred into BRIN. The decision also left research and development agencies under Indonesian National Armed Forces to not to be integrated. The decision also led into various units and research formerly owned by LAPAN and BPPT which focused on military research and defense and security affairs being left out and relinquished to Ministry of Defense.

There was a proposed plan to form Defense Acquisition Institute, a military counterpart of BRIN, which intended to integrate all military research and development agencies in response of the decision. On 2 March 2022, Ministry of Defense and BRIN signed the MoU for research collaboration to bridge and closing the gap between military and civilian researchers. While the MoU was signed, on 17 June 2022, the formation of such agency came into fruition with formation of BPKTP thru Presidential Decree No. 94/2022.

2023 
On 2 February 2023, Air Marshal Hendrikus Haris Haryanto appointed as the first Head of the BPKTP. He replaced Air Vice Marshal Julexi Tambayong, the last Head of Balitbanghan. Air Marshal Hendrikus Haris Haryanto is former military aide-de-camp of the Vice President Boediono.

Lineage

Research Activities 
As military research agency, much extent of BPKTP research activity is unknown. However, excerpt of its research products is available. The excerpt covered 2011-2018 research of BPKTP during Balitbanghan period. BPKTP research activities divided into 4 clusters: Strategic Defense Research, Defense Resource, Defense Science and Technology, and Equipment Development.

Some of publicly known BPKTP research activities are:

 Strategic Defense Research
 Social studies in defense and military.
 National security and defense threats analysis.
 Studies in politics, social, economy, and cultures, and their relation to national defense and security.
 Area studies related to national defense and security.
 Studies in border politics, trans-national crimes, and border crimes.
 Strategic studies in border affairs and outer islands.
 Strategic studies in air defense.
 Studies in conflict resolutions and peace.
 Studies in strategic military maritime affairs.
 Studies in civil defense. 
 Studies in climate change and its effects in warfare and national defense.
 Studies in data security, cyber security, and cyber defense. 
 Studies in IED and delayed detonator for military purposes. 
 Strategic remote sensing and unmanned aerial vehicles application for military purposes. 
 Defense Resource
 National Defense Awareness Fostering Program.
 Human resources studies to support national defense.
 Strategic valuable mineral exploration and mining technology to support defense industries.
 Thorium-based nuclear reactor for future nuclear-fueled naval ships. 
 Survey for strategic installations and rocket launching system.
 Propellant research and development.
 Energy studies for military purposes.
 Food studies for military purposes.
 Studies in military bureaucracy reform.
 Disease surveillance for military purposes.
 Bioterrorism research and natural biological resources exploration for national defense purposes.
 Simulated warfare application development.
 Military women's studies. 
 Defense Science and Technology
 Development of mission control system for unmanned surface vehicles.
 Automation of heavy artilleries.
 Rocket development.
 Thorium-based nuclear reactor for defense purposes.
 Sentry gun development. 
 Military satellite development. 
 Military communication system development.
 Military software development.
 Small jet engine development.
 Smart bomb, and its guidance control system and seeker development. 
 IF-X development. 
 Warhead technology development. 
 Impact fuze rocket technology development. 
 Anti-radar ship coating technology development.
 Night-vision device technology development. 
 Body armor technology development. 
 UAV technology development.
 Military dynamic programming development. 
 Gauss cannon technology development.
 Military ergonomics studies. 
 GPS research. 
 Tank technology development. 
 Unmanned submarine technology development. 
 Equipment Development
 Development of missile vehicles and launch vehicles.
 Ground-to-ground 100 km-range rocket launcher.
 Cruise missile development.
 Man-portable air-defense system development.
 Radar development. 
 Anti-tank weaponry development. 
 Mobile command control vehicle development. 
 Hyperbaric chamber development. 
 Mini submarine development. 
 Combat boat development for interception.
 Amphibious vehicle development. 
 Armed patrol boat development. 
 Missiles development.

References  

Science and technology in Indonesia
Defense companies of Indonesia
2022 establishments in Indonesia